Rodmošci is a dispersed settlement southwest of Gornja Radgona in northeastern Slovenia.

Notable people
Notable people that were born or lived in Rodmošci include:
Anton Trstenjak (1906–1996), psychologist

References

External links
Rodmošci on Geopedia

Populated places in the Municipality of Gornja Radgona